Caesium oxalate (standard IUPAC spelling) dicesium oxalate, or cesium oxalate (American spelling) is the oxalate of caesium. Caesium oxalate has the chemical formula of Cs2C2O4.

Preparation 
Caesium oxalate can be prepared by passing carbon monoxide and carbon dioxide over caesium carbonate at 380 °C:

Cs2CO3 + CO + CO2 → Cs2C2O4 + CO2

Other alkali carbonates do not undergo transformation to oxalate.

Caesium carbonate can react with oxalic acid in aqueous solution to give caesium oxalate.

Cs2CO3 + H2C2O4•2H2O → Cs2C2O4•H2O + CO2 + H2O

Chemical Reactions 
Caesium oxalate can be reduced back into caesium carbonate and carbon dioxide by thermal decomposition.

Cs2C2O4 → Cs2CO3 + CO

Double salts 
Compounds that contain caesium and another element in addition to the oxalate anion are double salts. The oxalate may form a complex with a metal that can make a salt with caesium.

Examples include:

Mixed anion compounds containing caesium, oxalate and another anion also exist, such as the uranyl sulfate above, and caesium bis(oxalaoto)borate (CsBOB) (CsC4O8B).

References 

Caesium compounds
Oxalates